Irbid, known in ancient times as Arabella or Arbela (Άρβηλα in Ancient Greek), is the capital and largest city of Irbid Governorate. It has the second-largest metropolitan population in Jordan after Amman, with a population of around 2,003,800. As a city, Irbid is Jordan's third-largest, after Amman and Zarqa.

Irbid was built on successive Early Bronze Age settlements and was possibly the biblical Beth Arbel and the Arbila of the Decapolis, a Hellenistic league of the 1st-2nd century BCE. The population of Irbid swelled in the late 19th century, and prior to 1948 it served as a significant centre of transit trade.

The city is a major ground transportation hub between Amman, Syria to the north, and Mafraq to the east.

The Irbid region is also home to several colleges and universities. The two most prominent universities are Jordan University of Science and Technology and Yarmouk University.

History

Artifacts and graves in the area show that Irbid was inhabited in the Bronze Age. Pieces of pottery and wall stones found at Tell Irbid were estimated to be made in the year 3200 B.C. In the Hellenistic period, Irbid, then known as Arabella was a major trade center. Before the advent of Islam, Arabella was famous for producing some of the best wines in the ancient world. The area in the region had extremely fertile soil and moderate climate, allowing the growing of high quality grapes.

After the Muslim conquests, the city came under the rule of the Muslim Empire and became known as Irbid, at which time it shifted from wine to olive oil production. Wheat was also an important product in the area.

In 1596 it appeared in the Ottoman tax registers named as Irbid, situated in the nahiya (subdistrict) of Bani Juhma, part of the Sanjak of Hawran. It had 72 households and 35 bachelors; all Muslim. The villagers paid a fixed tax-rate of 25% on agricultural products; including wheat (22,500 akçe), barley, summer crops, fruit trees, goats and bee-hives; in addition to a market toll. The total tax was 38,116 akçe.

In 1838, Eli Smith noted Irbid (Arbela) as being a place with Sunni Muslim.

The Jordanian census of 1961 found 44,585 inhabitants in Irbid.

Present-day
Irbid today combines the bustle of a provincial Middle Eastern town and the youthful nightlife of a typical college town. The city is home to four major universities: Yarmouk University, Jordan University of Science and Technology, Irbid National University and Jadara University. In addition, it is home for two campuses of Balqa Applied University and several private colleges. University Street, which defines the western border of the Yarmouk University campus, is popular with locals as well as with the occasional foreign visitors who stop by to relax in any of its numerous restaurants and cafés that open late into the night.

Though not usually a major tourist destination itself, Irbid is home to two notable museums: the Museum of Jordanian Heritage and the Jordan Natural History Museum, both on the campus of Yarmouk University. Furthermore, Irbid's strategic location in northern Jordan makes it a convenient starting point for tourists interested in seeing the northern Jordan Valley; visiting Umm Qais, Beit Ras (Capitolias), Pella, Ajloun, Umm el-Jimal, La Foossi baitaras and other historical sites; or traveling on to Syria.

Geography

Irbid is situated in northern Jordan, on a fertile plateau. As of 2010, the city of Irbid encompassed an area of 30 km2, with residential areas making up 74.3% of the total area, followed by the Services areas occupying 9.5%, then Empty or unoccupied areas of 7.7%, then 4.2% is classified as Commercial areas, and 3.3% as Industrial areas, and finally gardens occupied 1% of the total city area.

Border cities
 Um Qais
 Al Koura
 Mafraq
 Ar Ramtha

Climate
Irbid has a hot-summer Mediterranean climate (Köppen: Csa), common in the Levant region. Summers are hot at days with warm nights, while winters are cool and wet, with two snowy days on average.

Districts of Greater Irbid Municipality

Irbid is divided into 23 city districts forming smaller cities within the metropolitan sphere of influence of Irbid:

Cities, Towns, and Villages
Many villages surround the city of Irbid including:

 Birqish-Kufr Rakeb (برقش - كفر راكب)
 Irbid (اربد)
 Aṭ-Ṭaībah (الطيبة)
 Natfeh (ناطفه)
 Habaka (حبكا)
 Kufr-Rahta (كفررحتا)
 Al-Mazar Al-Shamali (المزار الشمالي)
 Hareema (حريما)
 Al'aal (علعال)
 Kufr Asad (كفرأسد)
 Kufr Aan (كفرعان)
 Jumha (جمحة)
 Kufryuba (كفر يوبا)
 Zahar (زحر)
 Qum (قمّ)
 Sammou' (سمّوع)
 Izmal (زمال)
 Kufrelma (كفر الماء)
 Sawm (سوم)
 Saydoor (صيدور)
 Kufr Soom (كفر سوم)
 Sama al-Rousan (سما الروسان)
 Ibser Abu Ali
 Assarieh (الصريح)
 Aidoon (ايدون)
 Al Husn (الحصن)
 Baleela (بليلة)
 Beit Ras (بيت راس)
 Dowgarah (دوقرة)
 En-Nu`aymeh (النعيمة)
 Habaka (حبكا)
 Houfa Al-Westiyyah
 Qumaim (قميم)
 Bushra (Jordan) (بشرى)
 Huwwarah (حوارة)
 Imrawah
 Al Ramtha (الرمثا)
 Sal (سال)
 Samad (صمد)
 Al Shajara (الشجرة)
 Al Turrah (الطرة)
 Fou'ara (فوعرة)
 Zoubia ( زوبيا)
 Jdaita (جديتا)
 Rehaba (رحابا)
 Kufor Alma (كفرالماء )
 Kharja (خرجا)
 Dair Yousef (دير يوسف)
 Dair Abos'eed (دير أبو سعيد)
 Kufor Kefia (كفر كفية)
 Summer (سمر)
 E'nbeh (عنبة)
 Bayt Yafa (بيت يافا)
 Dair Esse'neh (دير السعنة)
 Mandah (منده)
 Maru (Irbid) (مرو)
 Zabda (زبدة)
 Bait Idis (بيت ايدس)
 Makhraba (مخربا)
 Al-Murajjam
 Al Mughayer (المغير)

Hospitals

 Abu Obaida Hospital
 Al-Najah Hospital
 Al-Qawasmi Hospital
 Al-Ramtha Hospital
 Al-Yarmouk Hospital
 Ibn-Alnafees Hospital
 Irbid Islamic Hospital
 Irbid Speciality Hospital
 King Abdullah University Hospital
 Muaath Bin Jabal Hospital
 Princess Badeea Hospital
 Princess Basma Hospital
 Princess Rahma Hospital
 Princess Raya Hospital
 Rahbat Al-Wardieh Hospital
 Roman Catholic Hospital

Education
As of 2007, there were 70,000 registered students in Irbid's 10 universities, community colleges and institutes, of whom 8,000 were international students from 47 countries. This high concentration of institutions of higher education has played a key role in carving a unique identity of the city. The largest universities in Irbid are:

 Yarmouk University
 Jordan University of Science and Technology
 Irbid National University
 Al-Balqa` Applied University (Irbid campus)
 Jadara University

Private Schools in Irbid (sorted by alphabetical order):
 Adventist School
 Al-Arabiya Model School
 Al-Manara Schools       [P]
 Al-Nahda Private School [P]
 Alwatany center
 American University School of the Middle East 
 Dar Al Uloum Schools    [P]
 Greek Catholic School
 Irbid International Schools
 Irbid Model School      [P]
 Islamic School [P] (Al-Madares Al-Islamiya)
 Jeel Al Jadeed School
 Jordan National Schools [P]
 Khawla Bint Alazwar [P]
 Rosary Sisters School
 Shoa'a Alammel School [P]
 Yarmouk University Model School    [P]

Economy

Most of the city's economy is based on the services sector, that is directly or indirectly related to the higher education institutions in the city, as an example there are 26 book publishing companies in the city. The number of internet cafes per capita is the highest in the world that took Irbid to the Guinness Book of World Records. Irbid is considered the cultural capital of Jordan.  There is one Qualifying Industrial Zone in Irbid.

Sports
The Irbid-based club Al-Hussein (Irbid) was ranked fourth in the Jordanian football premier league in the year 2008. Its home matches are held in Prince Hasan Youth City's Stadium. The other major football club in Irbid is Al-Arabi. Established in 1945, it is one of the oldest athletic clubs in the country. As of 2008, there are 22 cultural and sport clubs registered in Irbid. Irbid hosted the 1999 Pan Arab Games.

Twin towns – sister cities

Irbid is twinned with:

  Gaziantep, Turkey
  Zhengzhou, China

Notable people

See also

Citations

General bibliography 

  
 El-Khouri, Lamia, "Roman and Byzantine Settlements in the Region of West Irbid," Palestine Exploration Quarterly, 139,3 (2007), 166–185.

External links

 Irbid - Jordan Tourism Board 
 Beautiful Natural Scenes From Al-Koura Department - Irbid
 Irbid News
 Greater Irbid Municipality
 Irbid Guide
 Irbid Discussion Forum 
 Al Husun FM Radio Station
 Photos of Irbid at the American Center of Research

 
Gilead
Populated places in Irbid Governorate